Robert Cecil Watkins (born March 12, 1948) is a former pitcher in Major League Baseball who played for the Houston Astros in 1969. He was selected by the Astros in the 1966 amateur draft.

External links

1948 births
Living people
Major League Baseball pitchers
Baseball players from San Francisco
Houston Astros players
Columbus Astros players
Cocoa Astros players
Oklahoma City 89ers players
Asheville Tourists players
Dallas–Fort Worth Spurs players
Bismarck-Mandan Pards players
Compton High School alumni